Demetrius of Magnesia (1st century BC) was a Greek grammarian and biographer, and a contemporary of Cicero and Atticus. He had, in Cicero's recollection, sent Atticus a work of his on concord,, which Cicero also was anxious to read. A second work of his, which is often referred to, was of an historical and philological nature, and treated of poets and other authors who bore the same name. This important work, to judge from what is quoted from it, contained the lives of the persons, and a critical examination of their merits. For example, Demetrius is cited by Diogenes Laertius as a key source in his biography of the historian Xenophon, providing information about Xenophon that would otherwise be unknown.

Notes

1st-century BC Greek people
1st-century BC writers
Ancient Greek grammarians
Ancient Greek biographers
Ancient Magnesia